Baimuru Airport  is an airfield serving Baimuru, in the Gulf Province of Papua New Guinea.

Airlines and destinations

References

External links
 

Airports in Papua New Guinea
Gulf Province